Ida Loo-Talvari (née Ida Loo; 19 June 1901, in Narva, Estonian Governorate, Russian Empire – 29 June 1997, in Stenungsund, near Göteborg, Sweden) was an Estonian opera singer. She was the wife of composer Evald Aav (first marriage) and the sister of the librettist Voldemar Loo.

Life 
Ida Loo-Talvari was born is Narva, Estonia. She was the second child of Juhan Loo and Helene Rosalie Katlasepp. Her elder brother was a famous librettist Voldemar Loo. She was studied in Berlin, Milan and Vienna. Her first husband was Evald Aav, an Estonian composer. The couple were married between 1926 and 1937. In 1938 she married Johannes Talvari. In 1944, following the Soviet re-occupation of Estonia, she fled to Sweden. She died in 1997 near Gothenburg, aged 96.

References 

1901 births
1997 deaths
20th-century Estonian women opera singers
Estonian operatic sopranos
People from Narva
Estonian World War II refugees
Estonian emigrants to Sweden
Estonian Academy of Music and Theatre alumni